Diango Hernández (born 1970) is a Cuban artist, known for his paintings. From 1994 to 2003, Hernández was involved with Ordo Amoris Cabinet, which he co-founded with Ernesto Oroza, Juan Bernal, Francis Acea and Manuel Piña. He is married to artist Anne Pöhlmann. He lives and works between Düsseldorf, Germany and Havana.

Biography 
Diango Hernández was born in Sancti Spíritus, Cuba in 1970. His mother was a high school teacher—and later professor—and his father was an engineer. He attended boarding school in the countryside as a teenager, going on to study at the Havana Superior Institute of Design (ISDI) from 1989 to 1994 where he received a degree in industrial design. After a brief stint at an architecture firm, he went on to form a collaboration experience together with Ernesto Oroza, Juan Bernal, Francis Acea and Manuel Piña under the name of Ordo Amoris Cabinet (OAC; Latin, Order of Love). From 1996 until 2003 Ordo Amoris Cabinet comprised only Hernández and Francis Acea. The group created sculptural installations which incorporated various research methodologies to address social and cultural issues in Cuba. They exhibited widely throughout the Americas and Europe, and disbanded in 2003. It was at this time that Hernández left Cuba for Europe.

Hernández's first solo show after OAC's dissolution took place at Frehrking Wiesehöfer in Cologne. Entitled Amateur, it consisted of over 2,000 drawings created during his time in Cuba, which explored his everyday life and thoughts and mediated on the fragility and immediateness that drawing allows. Throughout his practice, Hernández has continued to explore fragility and incompleteness across various mediums. 

His work draws heavily from his experiences and upbringing in Cuba and the culture of revolution. In 2006, for instance, Hernández had three shows entitled Spies (at Alexander and Bonin in New York), Traitors (at Pepe Cobo in Madrid), and Revolution (at Kunsthalle Basel) which he describes as "meticulously connected...the words 'revolution', 'spies' and 'traitors' are in the first place very familiar words or concepts to me and to my generation. All three of them have been repeated, printed and amplified millions of times by the Cuban officials...I wanted to take these big monumental words into my hands; I wanted to domesticate them. In Cuba printed or amplified politics can only be stopped if we shut our front door and switch off the radio and this is somehow what I did with these series of exhibitions; I finally moved from the streets to my living room."

Hernández’s works has been included at the 51st Venice Art Biennale (Arsenale, 2005), São Paulo Art Biennial (2006), Biennale of Sydney (2006), Kunsthalle Basel (2006), Munich’s Haus der Kunst (2010), London’s Hayward Gallery (2010) and more recently with a survey at the MART in Rovereto, Italy, (2011). Hernández currently lives and works in Düsseldorf, Germany.

Selected exhibitions

Selected solo exhibitions 
 2022: Olaismo, Wizard Gallery, Milan
 2021: Instopia, Galerie Barbara Thumm, Berlin
 2021: New Viewings #33, Galerie Barbara Thumm, Berlin
 2020: New Viewings #1 & #14, Galerie Barbara Thumm, Berlin
 2019: Salvavidas, Arsenal Habana, Cuba
 2019: Rebel Standing, Galerie Barbara Thumm, Berlin
 2018: ERAS IMAGINARIAS, Galerie Barbara Thumm, Berlin
 2018: Nuestra America, FL - Wizard Gallery, Milan
 2017: Sobre las Olas, Kunsthalle Lingen
 2016: Theoretical Beach, Museum Morsbroich, Leverkusen
 2016: Hurricanes, FL - Wizard Gallery, Milan
 2016: Marina, Galerie Barbara Thumm, Berlin
 2015: The Book of Waves, Marlborough Contemporary, London
 2013: Komplette Zimmer, Capitain Petzel, Berlin
 2011-12: Living Rooms, a Survey, Museo di arte moderna e contemporanea di Trento e Rovereto, Italy
 2011: Diango Hernández: Crystal Clear, Nicolas Krupp Contemporary, Basel
 2010: Diango Hernández: Museums, selected works 1996-2010, Galerie Michael Wiesehöfer, Cologne
 2009: Diango Hernández: Losing You Tonight, Museum für Gegenwartskunst, Siegen
 2009: TH-INK, Alexander and Bonin, New York
 2006: Revolution, Kunsthalle Basel
 2006: Spies, Alexander and Bonin, New York
 2006: Traitors, Galería Pepe Cobo, Madrid
 2005: The Museum of Capitalism, Städtischen Museum Abteiberg, Mönchengladbach
 2003: Amateur, Frehrking Wiesehöfer, Cologne
 2002: Sweet Home, Espacio Aglutinador, Havana*
 2001: Mousepads and Screensavers, ArtPace, San Antonio, TX*
 1999: Esta cerca es provisional: evite ser requerido/This is a provisional Fence: Keep Out, Center for the Development of the Visual Arts, Havana*
 1995: Agua con azucar y La muestra provisional/Sugar Water and The Provisional Show, Center for the Development of the Visual Arts, Havana; Museo de Arte Contemporaneo y Diseffo (MACD), San José, Costa Rica*
(* as a member of Ordo Amoris Cabinet)

 Selected group exhibitions 
 2019/2020: La Habana: Imagenes de cinco siglos, Museo Nacional del Bellas Artes de Cuba, Havana
 2019: No habrá nunca una puerta. Estás adentro. Obras de la Coleção Teixeira de Freitas, Sala de Arte Santander, Madrid
 2019: Realitätscheck, Kunstraum Potsdam, Potsdam
 2018: Otro amanecer en el tropico, Stiftung Reinbeckhallen, Berlin 
 2018: Lilia & Tulipan, Kunsthalle Lingen, Lingen
 2018: Sammlung mit losen Enden 03: 21. Jahrhundert – Akt 2”, Kunsthaus NRW, Aachen
 2017: Two Destinations: Diango Hernández and Anne Pöhlmann, Dortmunder Kunstverein
 2016-17: We Call It Ludwig, Museum Ludwig, Cologne
 2016: WERE IT AS IF, Witte de With Center for Contemporary Art, Rotterdam
 2014: Beyond the Supersquare, The Bronx Museum of the Arts, New York
 2013: The New Man and The New Woman, Marlborough Contemporary, London
 2012: The Grand Tour, Alexander and Bonin, New York
 2010-11: The New Décor, Hayward Gallery, London; Garage Museum of Contemporary Art, Moscow
 2010: International 10 Exhibition: Touched, Liverpool Biennial
 2007: XXI Ateliers Internationaux du FRAC des Pays de la Loire, Carquefou
 2006: Zones of Contact, 2006 Biennale of Sydney
 2004: Flesh at War with Enigma, Kunsthalle Basel
 2002: Cuba-With Eyes of Stone and Water, Helsinki Art Museum*
 1999: CUBA, Present!, Barbican Centre, London*
 1998: Thinking Aloud, Hayward Gallery, London; Kettle's Yard, Cambridge; Cornerhouse, Manchester*

 Collections 
 Inhotim Centro de Arte Contemporânea, Belo Horizonte
 FRAC des Pays de la Loire, Carquefou
 Museo de Arte Contemporáneo de Castilla y León, (MUSAC)
 Colección Bergé, Madrid
 Rheingold Collection, Mönchengladbach
 Städtisches Museum Abteiberg, Mönchengladbach
 Museum of Modern Art, New York
 Kunstmuseum Liechtenstein, Vaduz

 Selected bibliography 
 Kreuzer, Stefanie, ed. Theoretical Beach. Distanz Verlag, Berlin, 2016 
 Diango Hernández: The Book of Waves. ex cat. Marlborough Contemporary, London, 2015 
 Vermeulen, Timotheus and Gerhard Obermüller. Socialist Nature, ex. cat. Berlin: Distanz Verlag, 2014 
 Diango Hernández: The New Man and the New Woman, ex. cat. London: Marlborough Contemporary, 2013 
 Diango Hernández. Living Rooms, a Survey, ex. cat. Rovereto/Trento, Italy: Museo di Arte Moderna e Contemporánea di Trento e Rovereto, 2011 
 Hernández, Diango. Home. New York: Alexander and Bonin Publishing, Inc., 2011 
 Diango Hernández: Diamonds and Stones, My Education.'' ex cat. Wizard Gallery, Milan, 2008

References

External links 
 Official website
 Hernández at Alexander and Bonin
 Hernández at Wizard gallery 

1970 births
Living people
People from Sancti Spíritus
Cuban contemporary artists
Conceptual artists